Miletus (Hittite transcription Millawanda or Milawata (exonyms);) was an ancient Greek city on the western coast of Anatolia, near the mouth of the Maeander River in ancient Ionia. Its ruins are located near the modern village of Balat in Aydın Province, Turkey. Before the Persian rule that started in the 6th century BC, Miletus was considered among the greatest and wealthiest of Greek cities.

Evidence of first settlement at the site has been made inaccessible by the rise of sea level and deposition of sediments from the Maeander. The first available evidence is of the Neolithic. In the early and middle Bronze Age the settlement came under Minoan influence. Legend has it that an influx of Cretans occurred displacing the indigenous Leleges, and the site was renamed Miletus after a place in Crete.

Recorded history at Miletus begins with the records of the Hittite Empire, and the Mycenaean records of Pylos and Knossos, in the Late Bronze Age. Miletus was a Mycenaean stronghold on the coast of Asia Minor from c. 1450 to 1100 BC.

The 13th century BC saw the arrival of Luwian language speakers from south central Anatolia calling themselves the Carians. Later in that century other Greeks arrived. The city at that time rebelled against the Hittite Empire. After the fall of that empire the city was destroyed in the 12th century BC and starting about 1000 BC was resettled extensively by the Ionian Greeks. Legend offers an Ionian foundation event sponsored by a founder named Neleus from the Peloponnesus.

The Greek Dark Ages were a time of Ionian settlement and consolidation in an alliance called the Ionian League. The Archaic Period of Greece began with a sudden and brilliant flash of art and philosophy on the coast of Anatolia. In the 6th century BC, Miletus was the site of origin of the Greek philosophical (and scientific) tradition, when Thales, followed by Anaximander and Anaximenes (known collectively, to modern scholars, as the Milesian school), began to speculate about the material constitution of the world, and to propose speculative naturalistic (as opposed to traditional, supernatural) explanations for various natural phenomena.

History

Neolithic 
The earliest available archaeological evidence indicates that the islands on which Miletus was originally placed were inhabited by a Neolithic population in 3500–3000 BC. Pollen in core samples from Lake Bafa in the Latmus region inland of Miletus suggests that a lightly grazed climax forest prevailed in the Maeander valley, otherwise untenanted. Sparse Neolithic settlements were made at springs, numerous and sometimes geothermal in this karst, rift valley topography. The islands offshore were settled perhaps for their strategic significance at the mouth of the Maeander, a route inland protected by escarpments. The graziers in the valley may have belonged to them, but the location looked to the sea.

Middle Bronze Age 
The prehistoric archaeology of the Early and Middle Bronze Age portrays a city heavily influenced by society and events elsewhere in the Aegean, rather than inland.

Minoan period
The earliest Minoan settlement of Miletus dates to 2000 BC. Beginning at about 1900 BC artifacts of the Minoan civilization acquired by trade arrived at the site. For some centuries the location received a strong impulse from that civilization, an archaeological fact that tends to support but not necessarily confirm the founding legend—that is, a population influx from Crete. According to Strabo:Ephorus says: Miletus was first founded and fortified above the sea by Cretans, where the Miletus of olden times is now situated, being settled by Sarpedon, who brought colonists from the Cretan Miletus and named the city after that Miletus, the place formerly being in possession of the Leleges.The legends recounted as history by the ancient historians and geographers are perhaps the strongest; the late mythographers have nothing historically significant to relate.

Late Bronze Age 

Recorded history at Miletus begins with the records of the Hittite Empire and the Mycenaean records of Pylos and Knossos, in the Late Bronze Age.

Mycenaean period
Miletus was a Mycenaean stronghold on the coast of Asia Minor from c. 1450 to 1100 BC. In c. 1320 BC, the city supported an anti-Hittite rebellion of Uhha-Ziti of nearby Arzawa. Muršili ordered his generals Mala-Ziti and Gulla to raid Millawanda, and they proceeded to burn parts of it; damage from LHIIIA found on-site has been associated with this raid. In addition the town was fortified according to a Hittite plan.

Miletus is then mentioned in the "Tawagalawa letter", part of a series including the Manapa-Tarhunta letter and the Milawata letter, all of which are less securely dated. The Tawagalawa letter notes that Milawata had a governor, Atpa, who was under the jurisdiction of Ahhiyawa (a growing state probably in LHIIIB Mycenaean Greece); and that the town of Atriya was under Milesian jurisdiction. The Manapa-Tarhunta letter also mentions Atpa. Together the two letters tell that the adventurer Piyama-Radu had humiliated Manapa-Tarhunta before Atpa (in addition to other misadventures); a Hittite king then chased Piyama-Radu into Millawanda and, in the Tawagalawa letter, requested Piyama-Radu's extradition to Hatti.

The Milawata letter mentions a joint expedition by the Hittite king and a Luwian vassal (probably Kupanta-Kurunta of Mira) against Miletus, and notes that the city (together with Atriya) was now under Hittite control.

Homer mentions that during the time of the Trojan War, Miletus was an ally of Troy and was city of the Carians, under Nestor and Amphimachus.

In the last stage of LHIIIB, the citadel of Bronze Age Pylos counted among its female slaves a  mi-ra-ti-ja, Mycenaean Greek for "women from Miletus", written in Linear B syllabic script.

Fall of Miletus

During the collapse of Bronze Age civilization, Miletus was burnt again, presumably by the Sea Peoples.

Dark Age
Mythographers told that Neleus, a son of Codrus the last King of Athens, had come to Miletus after the "Return of the Heraclids" (so, during the Greek Dark Ages). The Ionians killed the men of Miletus and married their widows. This is the mythical commencement of the enduring alliance between Athens and Miletus, which played an important role in the subsequent Persian Wars.

Archaic period

The city of Miletus became one of the twelve Ionian city-states of Asia Minor to form the Ionian League.

Miletus was one of the cities involved in the Lelantine War of the 8th century BC.

Ties with Megara

Miletus is known to have early ties with Megara in Greece. According to some scholars, these two cities had built up a "colonisation alliance". In the 7th/6th century BC they acted in accordance with each other.

Both cities acted under the leadership and sanction of an Apollo oracle. Megara cooperated with that of Delphi. Miletus had her own oracle of Apollo Didymeus Milesios in Didyma. Also, there are many parallels in the political organisation of both cities.

According to Pausanias, the Megarians said that their town owed its origin to Car, the son of Phoroneus, who built the city citadel called 'Caria'. This 'Car of Megara' may or may not be one and the same as the 'Car of the Carians', also known as Car (King of Caria).

In the late 7th century BC, the tyrant Thrasybulus preserved the independence of Miletus during a 12-year war fought against the Lydian Empire. Thrasybulus was an ally of the famous Corinthian tyrant Periander.

Miletus was an important center of philosophy and science, producing such men as Thales, Anaximander and Anaximenes. Referring to this period, religious studies professor F. E. Peters described pan-deism as "the legacy of the Milesians".

By the 6th century BC, Miletus had earned a maritime empire with many colonies, but brushed up against powerful Lydia at home, and the tyrant Polycrates of its neighbor to the west, Samos.

First Achaemenid period

When Cyrus of Persia defeated Croesus of Lydia in the middle of the 6th century BC, Miletus fell under Persian rule. In 499 BC, Miletus's tyrant Aristagoras became the leader of the Ionian Revolt against the Persians, who, under Darius the Great, quashed this rebellion and punished Miletus by selling all of the women and children into slavery, killing the men, and expelling all of the young men as eunuchs, thereby assuring that no Miletus citizen would ever be born again. A year afterward, Phrynicus produced the tragedy The Capture of Miletus in Athens. The Athenians fined him for reminding them of their loss.

Classical Greek period

In 479 BC, the Greeks decisively defeated the Persians on the Greek mainland at the Battle of Plataea, and Miletus was freed from Persian rule. During this time several other cities were formed by Milesian settlers, spanning across what is now Turkey and even as far as Crimea. The city's gridlike layout became famous, serving as the basic layout for Roman cities.

Second Achaemenid period

In 387 BC, the Peace of Antalcidas gave the Persian Achaemenid Empire under king Artaxerxes II control of the Greek city-states of Ionia, including Miletus.

In 358 BC, Artaxerxes II died and was succeeded by his son Artaxerxes III, who, in 355 BC, forced Athens to conclude a peace, which required its forces to leave Asia Minor (Anatolia) and acknowledge the independence of its rebellious allies.

Macedonian period

In 334 BC, the Siege of Miletus by the forces of Alexander the Great of Macedonia conquered the city. The conquest of most of the rest of Asia Minor soon followed.

When Alexander died in 323 BC, Miletus came under the control of Ptolemy, governor of Caria, and his satrap of Lydia, Asander, who had become autonomous. In 312 BC, Macedonian general Antigonus I Monophthalmus sent Docimus and Medeius to free the city and grant autonomy, restoring the democratic patrimonial regime. In 301 BC, after Antigonus I was killed in the Battle of Ipsus  by the coalition of Lysimachus, Cassander, and Seleucus I Nicator, founder of the Seleucid Empire, Miletus maintained good relations with all the successors after Seleucus I Nicator made substantial donations to the sanctuary of Didyma and returned the statue of Apollo that had been stolen by the Persians in 494 BC.

In 295 BC, Antigonus I's son Demetrius Poliorcetes was the eponymous archon (stephanephorus) in the city, which allied with Ptolemy I Soter of Egypt, while Lysimachus assumed power in the region, enforcing a strict policy towards the Greek cities by imposing high taxes, forcing Miletus to resort to lending.

Seleucid period
Around 287/286 BC Demetrius Poliorcetes returned, but failed to maintain his possessions and was imprisoned in Syria. Nicocles of Sidon, the commander of  Demetrius' fleet surrendered the city. Lysimachus dominated until 281 BC, when he was defeated by the Seleucids at the Battle of Corupedium. In 280/279 BC the Milesians adopted a new chronological system based on the Seleucids.

Egyptian period

In 279 BC, the city was taken from Seleucid king Antiochus II by Egyptian king Ptolemy II Philadelphus, who donated a large area of land to cement their friendship, and it remained under Egyptian sway until the end of the century.

Aristides of Miletus, founder of the bawdy Miletian school of literature, flourished in the 2nd century BC.

Roman period

After an alliance with Rome, in 133 BC the city became part of the province of Asia.

Miletus benefited from Roman rule and most of the present monuments date to this period.

The New Testament mentions Miletus as the site where the Apostle Paul in 57 AD met the elders of the church of Ephesus near the close of his Third Missionary Journey, as recorded in Acts of the Apostles (Acts 20:15–38). It is believed that Paul stopped by the Great Harbour Monument and sat on its steps. He might have met the Ephesian elders there and then bade them farewell on the nearby beach. Miletus is also the city where Paul left Trophimus, one of his travelling companions, to recover from an illness (2 Timothy 4:20). Because this cannot be the same visit as Acts 20 (in which Trophimus accompanied Paul all the way to Jerusalem, according to Acts 21:29), Paul must have made at least one additional visit to Miletus, perhaps as late as 65 or 66 AD. Paul's previous successful three-year ministry in nearby Ephesus resulted in the evangelization of the entire province of Asia (see Acts 19:10, 20; 1 Corinthians 16:9). It is safe to assume that at least by the time of the apostle's second visit to Miletus, a fledgling Christian community was established in Miletus.

In 262 new city walls were built.

However the harbour was silting up and the economy was in decline. In 538 emperor Justinian rebuilt the walls but it had become a small town.

Byzantine period

During the Byzantine age the see of Miletus was raised to an archbishopric and later a metropolitan bishopric. The small Byzantine castle called Palation located on the hill beside the city, was built at this time. Miletus was headed by a curator.

Turkish rule

Seljuk Turks conquered the city in the 14th century and used Miletus as a port to trade with Venice.

In the 15th century the Ottomans utilized the city as a harbour during their rule in Anatolia. As the harbour became silted up, the city was abandoned.

The Ilyas Bey Complex from 1403 with its mosque is a Europa Nostra awarded cultural heritage site in Miletus.

Archaeological excavations 
 
The first excavations in Miletus were conducted by the French archaeologist Olivier Rayet in 1873, followed by the German archaeologists Julius Hülsen and Theodor Wiegand between 1899 and 1931.
Excavations, however, were interrupted several times by wars and various other events.
Carl Weickart excavated for a short season in 1938 and again between 1955 and 1957.
He was followed by Gerhard Kleiner and then by Wolfgang Muller-Wiener.
Today, excavations are organized by the Ruhr University of Bochum, Germany.

One remarkable artifact recovered from the city during the first excavations of the 19th century, the Market Gate of Miletus, was transported piece by piece to Germany and reassembled. It is currently exhibited at the Pergamon Museum in Berlin. The main collection of artifacts resides in the Miletus Museum in Didim, Aydın, serving since 1973.

Archaeologists discovered a cave under the city's theatre and believe that it is a "sacred" cave which belonged to the cult of Asklepius.

Examples of the Milesian Vase

Geography 

The ruins appear on satellite maps at 37°31.8'N 27°16.7'E, about 3 km north of Balat and 3 km east of Batıköy in Aydın Province, Turkey.

In antiquity the city possessed a harbor at the southern entry of a large bay, on which two more of the traditional twelve Ionian cities stood: Priene and Myus. The harbor of Miletus was additionally protected by the nearby small island of Lade. Over the centuries the gulf silted up with alluvium carried by the Meander River. Priene and Myus had lost their harbors by the Roman era, and Miletus itself became an inland town in the early Christian era; all three were abandoned to ruin as their economies were strangled by the lack of access to the sea. There is a Great Harbor Monument where, according to the New Testament account, the apostle Paul stopped on his way back to Jerusalem by boat. He met the Ephesian Elders and then headed out to the beach to bid them farewell, recorded in the book of Acts 20:17-38.

Geology 
During the Pleistocene epoch the Miletus region was submerged in the Aegean Sea. The site of Miletus was part of the mainland.

At about 1500 BC the karst shifted due to small crustal movements and the islands consolidated into a peninsula. Since then the sea has risen 1.75 m but the peninsula has been surrounded by sediment from the Maeander river and is now land-locked. Sedimentation of the harbor began at about 1000 BC, and by 300 AD Lake Bafa had been created.

Gallery

Colonies 

Miletus became known for the great number of colonies it founded. It was considered the greatest Greek metropolis and founded more colonies than any other Greek city. 
Pliny the Elder (Natural History, 5.112) says that Miletus founded over 90 colonies. Among them are:

Abydos
Amisos
Apollonia Pontica
Borysthenites (Berezan)
Cardia
Cius
Colonae
Cotyora
Cyzicus
Dioscurias
Hermonassa
Histria
Kepoi
Kerasous
Lampsacus
Leros
Limnae
Miletopolis
Myrmekion (?)
Nymphaion
Odessos
Olbia
Paesus
Panticapaeum
Parium
Patraeus
Phanagoria
Phasis
Pityus
Priapus
Proconnesus
Prusias (?)
Sinope
Scepsis
Tanais
Theodosia
Tieion
Tomis
Tyras
Tyritake
Trapezunt

Notable people 

Arctinus of Miletus (775 BC – 741 BC), epic poet
Thales (c. 624 BC – c. 546 BC), Pre-Socratic philosopher
Anaximander (c. 610 BC – c. 546 BC), Pre-Socratic philosopher and geographer
Cadmus (fl. c. 550 BC), writer
Anaximenes (c. 585 BC – c. 525 BC), Pre-Socratic philosopher
Aristagoras (fl. 6th-5th century BC), Tyrant of Miletus
Phocylides (born c. 560 BC), Greek gnomic poet 
Hecataeus (c. 550 BC – c. 476 BC), Greek historian
Histiaeus (died 493 BC), ruler of Miletus
Leucippus (fl. first half of 5th century BC), philosopher and originator of Atomism (his association with Miletus is traditional, but disputed)
Hippodamus (c. 498 – 408 BC), urban planner
Aspasia (c. 470 – 400 BC) courtesan, and mistress of Pericles, was born in Miletus
Aristides (fl. 2nd century BC), writer
Monime (died 72/71 BC), a Greek noblewoman and one of the wives of Mithridates VI Eupator
Alexander Polyhistor (fl. 1st century AD), Greek scholar, born in Miletus before being taken as a slave to Rome
Aeschines of Miletus (fl. 1st century AD), a distinguished orator in the Asiatic style 
Isidore (fl. 6th century AD), Greek architect
Hesychius (fl. 6th century AD), Greek chronicler and biographer
Timagenes or Timogenes, historian and rhetor
Philiscus of Miletus, rhetor. Teacher of Neanthes of Cyzicus
Hellanicus, historian
Dionysicles of Miletus, sculptor. One of his famous works was a statue, at Leonidaion, of Democrates of Tenedos who was an ancient Olympic winner at wrestling 
Baccheius or Bacchius of Miletus (Βακχεῖος), a writer. He wrote a work on agriculture.

See also 
Cities of the ancient Near East

References and sources
References

Sources

Further reading

External links

Official website
Ausgrabungen in Milet official site of the excavations in Miletus by Ruhr-Universität Bochum 
Ancient Coins of Miletus
Livius picture archive: Miletus
Some 250 pictures of site and museum
Greek Inscriptions of Miletus in English translation
The Theatre at Miletus, The Ancient Theatre Archive, Theatre specifications and virtual reality tour of theatre

Details about most of the monuments
Walking the sacred pagan path from Ancient Miletus to Didim

 
Former populated places in Turkey
Archaeological sites in the Aegean Region
Ancient Greek archaeological sites in Turkey
Roman sites in Turkey
History of Aydın Province
Tourist attractions in Aydın Province
Ionian League
Buildings and structures in Aydın Province
Members of the Delian League
Greek city-states
Late Bronze Age collapse
Populated places in ancient Caria
New Testament cities
Didim District